August Club, also called August Club Since 1969, is a 2013 Malayalam romantic drama film directed by K. B. Venu. Rima Kallingal stars in the story about the nuances in marital life. The film's screenplay is written by Anantha Padmanabhan and is based on his novelette titled Venalinte Kalaneekkangal. August Club marked the debut of both K. B. Venu and Anantha Padmanabhan. The film was produced by V S Atheesh.

Plot
August Club is a woman-centric film told from the point of view of Savithri, a young upper middle class housewife. She is the unrivalled chess champion of a nearby local club. She shares a loving and sensual relationship with her husband Nandan, who is a busy business executive. A new member Shishir joins the club and defeats Savithri in the game of chess. Shishir, also a lover of music and poetry like Savitri, is drawn to her.

Cast

 Rima Kallingal as Savithri
 Murali Gopy as Nandagopan
 Thilakan as KPT Menon
 Praveen Anidil as Shishir
 Sukumari as Bhagavati Amma
 Mala Aravindan as Lazar
 K. P. A. C. Lalitha as Nandan's Amma
 Rakendu
 Sunil Sukhada as Lona
 Monisha Sagar as Leena Zacharias
 Sasi Kalinga as Cheru
 Unni Thrippunithura as Appan
 Arun as Kishore
 Ganapathi S Poduval as Benny
 Esther Anil
 Krishna
 Cherthala Lalitha as Reetha
 Tovino Thomas as Mahesh (Cameo appearance)

Production
The film is journalist-turned television personality K. B. Venu's directorial debut. It is also the debut attempt at screen-writing for Anantha Padmanabhan, son of writer and filmmaker Padmarajan.

The film is based on the novelette Venalinte Kalaneekkangal which was published in the Malayala Manorama Vishuppathippu. "When I wrote Venalinte Kalaneekkangal, I never thought of converting it into a movie. It was Lal Jose, my friend, who discovered an inherent cinematic probability," says Ananda Padmanabhan. Though the film is true to the original story, minor modifications have been introduced to broaden its cinematic scope. While the story begins in an urban setting, the narrative meanders to a village of chess players. The inspiration is from Marottichal, a village in Thrissur, which is famous for its chess-playing population. The scenarist says, "Though the subtleties of chess were not fully utilised in my novel in order to make it simple for the readers to comprehend, some shrewd complexities have been introduced to the script."

The film was initially titled Venalinte Kalaneekkangal itself but was later renamed as August Club which in the movie is a club where the main protagonists meet. K. B. Venu says, "We felt it created bit of a confusion. When the title was written in English, the meaning was altered. Though the name is poetic, we felt it didn't communicate well to the public. So, we decided to change. August Club is a club in the movie where the main protagonists meet. We felt it's catchy and does connect to the movie."

The film was launched on 21 May 2012 with a pooja ceremony which was attended by the crew members along with other actors and major filmmakers including K G George, Mohan, Lal Jose, Murali Gopi, Priyanandan, K. P. A. C. Lalitha and B. Unnikrishnan. Principal photography for the film started in June 2012 and took place entirely at Alappuzha in Kerala.

Music
The film's music was composed by the music director duo Bennet Veetraag with lyrics penned by Rafeeq Ahmed. "It's gonna be a different feel altogether in this movie," said Veetraag of the duo. There were three songs and Bennet sang two songs. The other singers include Shreya Ghoshal, Srinivas, Vijay Prakash, and Veetraag. Thilakan's son Shobi Thilakan has sung a few lines for Thilakan. Jaya Kerr, who just won the worldwide singing competition, sang in this movie for song of "Vaathil Charumo" along with Srinivas .

Critical reception
K. Padmakumar of Malayala Manorama gave the film a 2/5 rating, and said, "The limitations of stretching a small story into a full length movie is always visible" and that "No curiosity is generated till late after half time". Paresh C Palicha writing for Rediff.com said that the film is "rich in subtext and distinctive characters, [which] makes for an interesting watch", but was disappointed with a predictable climax. Unni R. Nair of Kerala9.com stated that "August Club stands out as a well-made and well scripted film, with neat, excellent performances by the key players." He labelled the film's screenplay as a "striking" one, background score as "one of the highlights of the film" and the songs as "too good", rating the film 3 of 5.

References

2013 films
2010s Malayalam-language films
Films based on Indian novels
2013 directorial debut films
Films scored by Bennet Veetraag